Musa Nazhmudinovich Umarov (3 July 1953 – 7 May 2022) was a Russian politician. He represented the Parliament of the Chechen Republic in the Federation Council from 2003 to 2008. He died in Moscow on 7 May 2022 at the age of 68.

References

1953 births
2022 deaths
People from Jambyl Region
Recipients of the Medal of the Order "For Merit to the Fatherland" II class
Russian male judoka
Russian sambo practitioners
Members of the Federation Council of Russia (after 2000)
Communist Party of the Soviet Union members